Lotti Odnoga (born 19 January 1999) is a Hungarian ice hockey defenseman and member of the Hungarian national team, currently playing college ice hockey with the St. Thomas Tommies women's ice hockey program in the Western Collegiate Hockey Association (WCHA) conference of the NCAA Division I.

Playing career 
Odnoga developed in the minor ice hockey department of Győri ETO HC in her home city of Győr in northwestern Hungary. She played on boys’ teams with Győri ETO HC throughout her childhood. At age 14, she began to also play with the KMH Budapest senior women's team in the Elite Women's Hockey League (EWHL), making her debut in the 2013–14 season. Odnoga continued to split her time between the Győri ETO HC junior men's teams and KMH Budapest during the 2014–15 season, appearing in fifteen games with KMH and recording 10 points on 4 goals and 6 assists.  

The 2015–16 season saw Odnoga relocate to the United States to attend Vermont Academy, a private boarding school in Saxtons River, Vermont. She became interested in attending the school after speaking with the Vermont Academy ice hockey coach at an international ice hockey camp in Lake Placid, New York during the summer of 2015, however, playing ice hockey and studying in the United States had long been a dream of hers. At Vermont Academy, she was a three-sport athlete, participating in association football, ice hockey, and tennis, and a ten-time letter winner. In her senior year, Odnoga served as captain of the tennis team and earned Division II All-NEPSAC First Team ice hockey honours and was named to the NEPSAC Class D Ice Hockey Tournament All-Star Team.

In her rookie season with the Dartmouth Big Green women's ice hockey program, she ranked fourth on the team in points, with 12 points in 29 games, and led the team in assists, with 10. She also led the team in penalty minutes, with 42 PIM – twelve more minutes than her second ranked teammate. Odnoga continued to be a leading defenseman for the Big Green in her sophomore season, again ranking fourth for points, with 11 points in 29 games, and tying with forward Gabby Billing for most assists, with 9. Her performance in the 2019–20 season merited selection to the All-Ivy Honorable Mention team, making Odnoga the only Dartmouth Big Green player to earn All-Ivy lauds that season.

Personal life 
Odnoga’s older brother, Mátyás, is a professional ice hockey player and has played with several Hungarian clubs in the Erste Liga.

She studied at Révai Miklós Gimnázium in Győr before moving to the United States to complete her secondary education and credits the school with providing a solid foundation in the English language.

As a child, Odnoga competed in equestrian sports at the national and regional levels, participating primarily in dressage and show jumping events.

Career statistics

Regular season and playoffs 

Sources: USCHO

International

Awards and honors
2015 World U18 Championship – Division I, Best Player on Team
2015  Héraklész Program Best Female Ice Hockey Player
2019–20 All-Ivy League Honorable Mention
2021 IIHF Women's World Championship, Top-3 Player on Team as selected by coaches
 2021–22 MJSZ Best Hungarian Women's Defenseman

References

External links 
 
Lotti Odnoga at the 2021–22 Dartmouth Big Green Women's Ice Hockey Roster

1999 births
Living people
Hungarian women's ice hockey defencemen
Dartmouth Big Green women's ice hockey players
Expatriate ice hockey players in the United States
Hungarian expatriate sportspeople in the United States
KMH Budapest (women) players
MAC Budapest (women) players
People from Győr
St. Thomas (Minnesota) Tommies women's ice hockey players
Vermont Academy alumni